Ultimate Darkness is the seventh studio album by a German gothic metal band Darkseed. It was released in 2005, with Massacre Records.

Track listing
All tracks by Stefan Hertrich

 Disbeliever - 03:59
 My Burden - 04:01
 Ultimate Darkness -  03:49
 Biting Cold - 04:19
 The Dark One - 03:44
 Save Me - 03:46
 Speak Silence - 04:11 
 Next to Nothing - 03:33
 Follow Me - 05:12 
 The Fall - 03:49
 Endless Night - 04:08
 Sleep Sleep Sweetheart - 04:32

Unheralded Past (Bonus-CD)
 Lifetime Alone - 03:59
 Walk In Me - 4:28
 Kingdom - 3:39
 I Turn to You - 4:27  (Melanie C cover)
 Watchful Spirit's Care - 5:04
 Like To A Silver Bow - 5:38
 The Bolt Of Cupid Fell - 4:09
 Give Me Light - 5:43
 Spiral Of Mistery - 3:57
 Hold Me - 4:51
 Not Alone - 3:29
 Wisdom And Magic - 5:04
 Paint It Black - 3:06  (The Rolling Stones cover)

Personnel 

Stefan Hertrich - Vocals, Electronics
Thomas Herrmann - Guitars
Tom Gilcher - Guitars
Martin Motnik – Bass
Armin Dorfler - Keyboards
Maurizio Guolo - Drums

In Other Media 
The song The Fall was written for the video game The Fall: Last Days of Gaia and a version was subsequently used in the trailer for the game.

References

Darkseed (band) albums
Nuclear Blast albums
2005 albums